This is a list of potato varieties or cultivars. Potato cultivars can have a range of colours due to the accumulation of anthocyanins in the tubers. These potatoes also have coloured skin, but many varieties with pink or red skin have white or yellow flesh, as do the vast majority of cultivated potatoes. The yellow colour, more or less marked, is due to the presence of carotenoids. Varieties with coloured flesh are common among native Andean potatoes, but relatively rare among modern varieties. They are rarely cultivated because their yield is usually lower than that of improved varieties and are sought after by some amateurs as a curiosity.

See also

 List of potato dishes

References

External links
 

 
Potato